Olearia covenyi is a species of flowering plant in the family Asteraceae and is endemic to New South Wales. It is a shrub with scattered egg-shaped leaves, and white and yellow, daisy-like inflorescences.

Description
The upper surface of the leaves is glabrous and the lower surface is covered with felt-like, yellowish-brown hairs. Each head has two or three white ray florets surrounding three or four yellow disc florets. Flowering occurs in November and December and the fruit is a glabrous achene, the pappus with 41–82 long bristles in two rows.

Taxonomy and naming
Olearia covenyi was first formally described by Nicholas Sèan Lander in 1991 in the journal Telopea from specimens collected in 1967 by Robert ('Bob') Coveny at Gloucester Tops. The specific epithet (covenyi) honours the collector of the type specimens.

Distribution and habitat
This daisy bush grows in wet forests in mountain areas from near Tenterfield to Barrington Tops and from the eastern side of the Great Dividing Range to Yarrowitch and Nundle in eastern New South Wales.

References 

conyeyi
Flora of New South Wales
Plants described in 1991